Halfweg is a hamlet in the Dutch province of Overijssel. It is located in the municipality of Staphorst, about 4 km northeast of that town.

References

Populated places in Overijssel
Staphorst